Suzanne Christy (1904–1974) was a Belgian film actress.

Selected filmography
 Le p'tit Parigot (1926)
 The Marriage of Mademoiselle Beulemans (1927)
 The Divine Voyage (1929)
 Southern Cross (1932)
 A Happy Man (1932)

References

Bibliography
 Goble, Alan. The Complete Index to Literary Sources in Film. Walter de Gruyter, 1999.

External links

1904 births
1974 deaths
Belgian film actresses
Belgian silent film actresses
20th-century Belgian actresses
Actresses from Brussels